"Blossoms Falling" is a song by Ooberman, released as their first single for Independiente, and the first to be taken from the band's debut album The Magic Treehouse. It reached No. 39 in the UK, the only Ooberman single to date to make the UK Singles Chart Top 40. B-side "The Things I Have Lost" was later re-recorded for the band's "First Day of the Holidays" single.

Track listing

CD (ISOM26MS)
 "Blossoms Falling" (Popplewell/Flett)
 "Grey" (Popplewell)
 "13" (Popplewell/Flett)

7" Vinyl (ISOM26S)
 "Blossoms Falling" (Popplewell/Flett)
 "The Things I Have Lost" (Popplewell)

10" Vinyl (ISOM24TE)
 "Blossoms Falling" (Popplewell/Flett)
 "Beeswax" (remix of "Bees") (Popplewell/Flett)

References

1999 singles
Ooberman songs
1999 songs
Independiente (record label) singles
Song recordings produced by Stephen Street